Park Hyun-beom (born 7 May 1987) is a South Korean footballer.

Park Hyun-bem is accurate spelling.

Club career
In 2008, Park started his professional career when he joined the Suwon Samsung Bluewings.

On 17 December 2009, he moved to Jeju United.

International career
On 28 March 2009, Park Hyun-bem made his first international match against Iraq. After three years, he substituted against Spain on 31 May 2012.

Club career statistics

References

External links
 
 National Team Player Record 
 

1987 births
Living people
Association football midfielders
South Korean footballers
South Korea international footballers
Suwon Samsung Bluewings players
Jeju United FC players
Ansan Mugunghwa FC players
K League 1 players
K League 2 players
Yonsei University alumni
Sportspeople from Gwangju